The 1996 St. Petersburg Open was a men's tennis tournament played on indoor carpet courts at the Petersburg Sports and Concert Complex in Saint Petersburg, Russia and was part of the World Series of the 1996 ATP Tour. The tournament was held from 18 March through 24 March 1996. Seventh-seeded Magnus Gustafsson won the singles title.

Finals

Singles

 Magnus Gustafsson defeated  Yevgeny Kafelnikov 6–2, 7–6(7–4)
 It was Gustafsson's 1st singles title of the year and the 8th of his career.

Doubles

 Yevgeny Kafelnikov /  Andrei Olhovskiy defeated  Nicklas Kulti /  Peter Nyborg 6–3, 6–4
 It was Kafelnikov's 1st title of the year and the 9th of his career. It was Olhovskiy's 1st title of the year and the 10th of his career.

References

External links
 Official website 
 ATP tournament profile
 ITF tournament edition details

St. Petersburg Open
St. Petersburg Open
St. Petersburg Open
St. Petersburg Open